Pudhumai Penn is a 1959 Indian Tamil-language film starring S. S. Rajendran and Rajasulochana. It was released on 26 June 1959.

Plot

Cast 
 S. S. Rajendran
 Rajasulochana
 T. S. Balaiah
 M. N. Rajam
 R. S. Manohar
 V. K. Ramasamy

Soundtrack 
Music was composed by T. G. Lingappa and lyrics were written by Udumalai Narayana Kavi, A. Maruthakasi, Ku. Ma. Balasubramaniam and Pattukottai Kalyanasundaram.

References

External links 
 

1950s Tamil-language films
1959 films
Films scored by T. G. Lingappa